The 1884 Radnor Boroughs by-election was a parliamentary by-election held for the House of Commons constituency of Radnor Boroughs in Wales on 30 October 1884.

Vacancy
The by-election was caused by the resignation of the sitting Liberal MP, Samuel Williams who resigned.

Candidates
The only candidate who nominated was agriculturalist Charles Coltman-Rogers.

Results

References

1884 elections in the United Kingdom
By-elections to the Parliament of the United Kingdom in Welsh constituencies
1884 in Wales
1880s elections in Wales
October 1884 events
History of Radnorshire